O Strange New World: American Culture - The Formative Years is a book written by Howard Mumford Jones and published by Viking Press in 1964; it won the 1965 Pulitzer Prize for General Non-Fiction.

References

External links

1964 non-fiction books
History books about the United States
Pulitzer Prize for General Non-Fiction-winning works
Viking Press books